Luis Soto may refer to:

 Luis Soto Mendez (born 1995), Costa Rican artistic gymnast
 Luis F. Soto, film and television director
 Luis Soto (footballer) (born 1946), Colombian footballer